Kilballyowen is the name of both a civil parish and a townland within that parish in County Clare, Ireland.  The name is also occasionally used for the slightly larger Catholic parish of Cross.

Kilballowen parish is located at the end of the Loop Head Peninsula which extends into the Atlantic Ocean to the north of the Shannon Estuary. The parish contains the villages of Cross and Kilbaha.  On the first edition Ordnance Survey of Ireland map of 1840, other settlements in the parish such as Ross, Trusklieve and Tullig were marked as villages, but depopulation during and after the Great Famine have rendered these settlements relatively insignificant today.

Location
The parish is part of the historical barony of Moyarta. It has a land border with only one parish - the eponymous Moyarta of the same barony.

As of 1845 the parish held the ruins of a church and a friary.
The old castle of Cloghaunsavaun (sometimes spelled Clehansevan) was blown down by a violent storm in 1802.
In 1580 the castle of Cloghaunsavaun belonged to Turlogh MacMahon of Carrigaholt.

Townlands
Townlands in the civil parish are Cloghaunbeg, Cloghaunsavaun, Cross, Feeard, Fodry, Kilbaha North, Kilbaha South, Kilballyowen, Kilcloher, Kiltrellig, Lissalougha, Moneen, Oughterard, Quilty, Rehy East, Rehy West, Ross, Tullig and Trusklieve.

Villages
Cross is home of the local Gaelic Athletic Association (GAA) club.
The GAA football club of Naomh Eoin was founded on 6 January 1974. It is based at Pairc Eoin. 
The village of Kilbaha is on Kilbaha Bay, another small fishing village.

Catholic parish
The village of Cross gives its name to the Catholic parish of Cross in the Roman Catholic Diocese of Killaloe.
The parish churches are Our Lady of Lourdes in Cross and St. John the Baptist in Kilbaha, also known as the Church of the Little Ark.
There are two holy wells in the parish, Tobar Cuain at Kiltrellig, and Tobar Senán at Kilcloher.

References

Parishes of the Roman Catholic Diocese of Killaloe
Civil parishes of County Clare